Wedding Rehearsal is a 1932 British romantic comedy film directed by Alexander Korda and starring Roland Young as a bachelor forced to seek a wife.

Plot
"Reggie", the carefree Marquis of Buckminster, is happy to serve as best man at his friends' weddings, but loathes the idea of getting married himself. However, his grandmother, the Dowager Marchioness of Buckminster, is impatient for him to have children and gives him an ultimatum: find a wife or she will cut off his allowance. She gives him a list of half a dozen or so candidates she has handpicked. At the head of the list are the twin daughters of the Earl of Stokeshire, Lady Mary Rose and Lady Rose Mary.  Observing his discomfort with interest is the Marchioness's secretary and companion, Miss Hutchinson (Merle Oberon in her first credited role).

Reggie had been seeing a beautiful married woman, Mrs. Dryden, but faced with poverty, he gives in. He flips a coin to decide between the twins, but finds (to his relief) that both already have beaus, "Bimbo" and "Tootles". However, the young ladies have been reluctant to approach their status-conscious father, as their sweethearts are commoners. Reggie comes up with the idea to save himself from marriage by getting all his grandmother's candidates engaged, starting with the twins. He helps the two couples by leaking the story of their engagements to the press, forcing the earl to (reluctantly) accept the situation. The guests spend the days leading up to the dual wedding at the earl's country estate, affording Reggie the opportunity to successfully play matchmaker for the rest of the women on his list.

One night, he finds Miss Hutchinson alone and crying; he guesses she is having romantic problems of her own and advises her to look her man straight in the eye and have it out. Later, she takes his advice...and confronts him. Reggie then discovers he is not so opposed to marriage after all. All is complete when the marchioness herself accepts the proposal of a longtime admirer, Major Harry Roxbury.

Cast
 Roland Young as Marquis of Buckminster
 George Grossmith, Jr. as Earl of Stokeshire
 John Loder as "Bimbo"
 Wendy Barrie as Lady Mary Rose
 Joan Gardner as Lady Rose Mary
 Merle Oberon as Miss Hutchinson
 Helen Maud Holt (Lady Tree) as Countess of Stokeshire
 Kate Cutler as Dowager Marchioness of Buckminster
 Maurice Evans as "Tootles"
 Morton Selten as Major Harry Roxbury
 Edmund Breon as Lord Fleet
 Laurence Hanray as News Editor
 Diana Napier as Mrs. Dryden

References

External links 
 
 
 

1932 films
British black-and-white films
Films directed by Alexander Korda
London Films films
1930s romantic comedy-drama films
Films produced by Alexander Korda
British romantic comedy-drama films
1932 comedy films
1932 drama films
1930s British films